The Río de la Plata (River Plate) is a river estuary in Argentina and Uruguay.

Río de la Plata may also refer to:
United Provinces of the Río de la Plata, a short lived nation in South America between 1810-1831
Río de la Plata Basin, the hydrographical area that covers parts of Argentina, Brazil, Bolivia, Paraguay and Uruguay
Río de la Plata Craton, one of the five cratons (ancient nuclei) of the South American continent
Viceroyalty of the Río de la Plata, an administrative district within the Spanish empire
Governorate of the Río de la Plata, an administrative district preceding the viceroyalty
Río de la Plata Bank, a building in Madrid by Antonio Palacios
Río de la Plata (Puerto Rico), a river in Puerto Rico
La Plata River (San Juan River), in the United States

See also
River Plate (disambiguation)
Platte River